Mahonia duclouxiana  is a plant species native to India, Myanmar (Burma), Thailand, and southern China (provinces of Yunnan, Guangxi, and Sichuan).

Mahonia duclouxiana is a shrub up to 4 m tall. Leaves are up to 70 cm long, with 4-9 pairs of leaflets plus a larger terminal leaflet, all shiny above, yellowish-green below. Flowers are yellow, borne in a large panicle. Berries are spherical, deep purple, up to 8 mm in diameter.

References

duclouxiana
Flora of China
Flora of India (region)
Flora of Myanmar
Flora of Thailand
Plants described in 1908